The discography of Epica, a Dutch symphonic metal band, consists of eight studio albums, five live albums, three extended plays, one soundtrack, and twenty-six singles.

Albums

Studio albums

EPs

Live albums

Soundtracks

Compilation albums

Singles

Video albums

Music videos

Guest appearances
"Sacred & Wild" (Powerwolf cover - originally from the album Preachers of the Night (July 19, 2013), released on July 20, 2018 on the "Communio Lupatum" of Powerwolf's album The Sacrament of Sin)

References

External links
 Epica discography at Discogs
 Epica discography on iTunes

Discographies of Dutch artists
Heavy metal group discographies